Sky Max is a British pay television channel which launched on 1 September 2021 along with Sky Showcase. It is owned and operated by Sky Group, a subsidiary of Comcast.

The channel was announced on 28 July 2021 to replace Sky One, which had been on air for nearly 40 years. It broadcasts the entertainment and drama output previously shown on Sky One -  the comedy output, for the most part, transferred to Sky Comedy. An Italian version of Sky Max called Sky Serie launched on 1 July 2021 with significant different programming.

Current programming
Sky Comedy broadcasts a variety of drama, comedy drama and unscripted series, both on live TV and on-demand.

Drama
 COBRA (series 2–3) (2021–present)
 The Rising (2022)
 The Midwich Cuckoos (2022)
 The Lazarus Project (2022–present)

Comedy drama
 Brassic (series 3–5) (2021–present)
 Agatha Raisin (series 4–5) (2021–present)
 Frayed (series 2) (2022)

Animation
 Moominvalley (series 3–4) (2022–present)

Unscripted

Game Show
 A League of Their Own (series 16–18) (2021–present)
 Never Mind the Buzzcocks (series 29–30) (2021–present)

Reality
 Dating No Filter (series 2) (2022)
 Rob & Romesh Vs (series 4–5) (2022–present)
 Hold The Front Page (2023)

Variety
 The Russell Howard Hour (series 5–6) (2021–present)
 Fantasy Football League (series 7) (2022)

Upcoming programming

Drama
 A Town Called Malice (2023)
 The Tattooist Of Auschwitz (TBA)
 Then You Run (2023)

Comedy drama
 Funny Woman (2023)

Unscripted

Variety
 The Overlap (2023)

Former programming

Drama
 Wolfe (2021)
 Temple (series 2) (2021)
 A Discovery of Witches (series 3) (2022)

Unscripted

Reality
 Got, Got Need (2022)

Acquired Programming
U.S. imports include shows from CBS Studios, Sony Pictures Television and Warner Bros. Television Studios
 The Blacklist (Final season)
 The Flash (Final season)
 The Flight Attendant
 Magnum P.I.
 NCIS: Los Angeles (Final season)
 Peacemaker
 Resident Alien
 SEAL Team
 S.W.A.T.
 Warrior

Notes

References

Sky television channels
Television channels and stations established in 2021
English-language television stations in the United Kingdom
Television channels in the United Kingdom
2021 establishments in the United Kingdom